Onnanu Nammal is a 1984 Indian Malayalam-language film directed by P. G. Vishwambharan and written by John Paul. The film is inspired by a story of  Kaloor Dennis. The film stars Mammootty, Seema, Mohanlal and Adoor Bhasi. The film has music composed by Ilaiyaraaja and Guna Singh with the former composing the songs and latter, the film score.

Plot
Nandagopal (Mohanlal) meets Seetha (Poornima Jayaram) and follows her to her house with his best friend (Manianpilla Raju), who is also Seetha's cousin. She stays with her father (Adoor Bhasi), elder sister Nirmala (Seema), her husband Sethu (Mammootty) and their daughter Sony (Shalini). Nirmala is pregnant with their second child.

He gets acquainted to her family and manages to get their marriage fixed. Two days before their marriage, while returning from Sony's birthday party, Nandu meets with an accident and unfortunately dies.

The whole family mourns for the loss, to rub salt in the wound, Nirmala has a miscarriage and due to complications gets paralysed and is bedridden. Even the doctor (Sukumari) tell Sethu that there is no hope of her coming back to a normal life. Due to pressure from his own father (Thilakan), Nirmala's family and the fact that his daughter needs a mother, Sethu marries Seetha with silent consent from Nirmala.

Everything goes smooth until one fine day Nirmala starts showing signs of coming back to normal life. Seetha upon realising that Nirmala prefers to die rather than coming between Sethu and Seetha, commits suicide.

Cast
Mammootty as Sethu
Mohanlal as Nanda Gopal
Poornima Jayaram as Seetha
Seema as Nirmala
Adoor Bhasi as Padmanabhan Nair
Baby Shalini as Sonykutty 
Manianpilla Raju
Meena as Karthyayaniamma
Thilakan  as Surendran, Sethu's father
Sukumari as Dr. Rachel

Soundtrack
The music was composed by Ilaiyaraaja with lyrics by Bichu Thirumala.

Notes 

 1.The cast is arranged according to the ending credits of the film.

References

External links

view the film
 ONNANU NAMMAL MALAYALAM MOVIE

1984 films
1980s Malayalam-language films
Films scored by Ilaiyaraaja
Films directed by P. G. Viswambharan